Brad Ring (born April 7, 1987) is a former American soccer player who previously played for Indy Eleven in the United Soccer League.

Career

College and amateur
Ring attended Guilford High School and played four years of college soccer for the Indiana University Hoosiers. He was a Big Ten All-Freshman Team selection, was a first-team All-Big Ten pick, a first-team NSCAA/adidas Great Lakes All-Region and second-team All-America selection, a Big Ten All-Tournament Team selection, and a semifinalist for the MAC Hermann Trophy as a junior in 2007, and was a third-team NSCAA All-American, an NSCAA Scholar All-American, and a member of the Academic All-Big Ten and NSCAA All-Great Lakes Region first-team as a senior while being named a MAC Hermann Trophy semifinalist for the second consecutive season.

During his college years Ring also played for Chicago Fire Premier in the USL Premier Development League and Princeton 56ers in the National Premier Soccer League.

Professional
Ring was drafted in the second round (17th overall) of the 2009 MLS SuperDraft by the San Jose Earthquakes.  He signed with the club a year later after sitting out the 2009 season with a hip injury.

He made his professional debut on April 24, 2010 against Chivas USA. He was traded by San Jose on Sept. 5, 2013 to the Portland Timbers. He appeared in one match with the Timbers, playing one minute of the match against Toronto on Sept. 7, 2013. During that minute the Timbers scored, giving Ring the highest team-goals-per-minute (1 goal/min) of any Timbers player ever.

In January 2014, Ring returned to his Indiana roots by signing a two-year contract with Indy Eleven in the North American Soccer League (NASL).

Ring extended his contract with Indy Eleven on 27 January 2017.

Ring announced his retirement from professional soccer on February 8, 2019.

Career statistics

References

External links
 

1987 births
Living people
American soccer players
Chicago Fire U-23 players
Indiana Hoosiers men's soccer players
Indy Eleven players
Major League Soccer players
North American Soccer League players
Portland Timbers players
San Jose Earthquakes draft picks
San Jose Earthquakes players
Soccer players from Illinois
Sportspeople from Rockford, Illinois
United States men's under-20 international soccer players
USL League Two players
Association football midfielders